Rue Saint-Denis may refer to:
Rue Saint-Denis (Montreal)
Rue Saint-Denis (Paris)

Odonyms referring to religion